Tell Me It's Real is the debut studio album by British music duo Seafret. It was released on 29 January 2016 by Sweet Jane Recordings. The album peaked at number 59 on the UK Albums Chart.

Singles
"Atlantis" was released as the lead single from the album on 1 May 2015. "Be There" was released as the second single from the album on 30 June 2015. "Wildfire" was released as the third single from the album on 27 November 2015.

Critical reception
Tell Me It's Real received mixed to positive reviews from music critics. Ashleigh Grady from Clash said, "As standalone singles, perhaps more of the tracks on ‘Tell Me It’s Real’ would hold a greater emotional impact but nevertheless there are moments of real beauty on Seafret's album. The sparse simplicity of the intricate guitar picking and emotive lyrics create a euphoric, wave-like quality [...] ‘Tell Me It’s Real’ will deliver more of the delicate emotion that they love, however, for the undecided listener, a little more variation and experimentation wouldn't go amiss." Molly Kerkham from ForgePress said, "While the album traverses tried and tested ground for love songs, Seafret’s song writing breathes fresh air into these topics. The songs are packed full of metaphors, but ... the lyrics avoid being a collection of romance truisms. At its worst, this album verges towards sounding a bit like a second-rate Mumford and Sons. There's too many over-enthusiastic yet drab guitar build ups."

Commercial performance
On 5 February 2016, Tell Me It's Real entered the UK Albums Chart at number 59, the album also entered the Scottish Albums Chart at number 90. On 7 February 2016, the album entered the Swiss Albums Chart at number 100.

Track listing

Charts

Release history

References

2016 albums